Miriam Buether is a German stage designer who primarily works in London theatre. She was born in Germany and studied stage design at Central Saint Martin’s College of Art and Design in London and costume design at the Akademie für Kostüm Design in Hamburg. Her recent work includes the West End musical Sunny Afternoon.

Her awards include
 2018 - London Evening Standard Theatre Award
 2012 - Critics’ Circle Theatre Award for Wild Swans
 2010 - Evening Standard Award for Sucker Punch and Earthquakes in London, 
 2008 - Hospital Club Creative Award for Theatre
 2004-05 - Critics' Award for Theatre in Scotland for The Wonderful World of Dissocia 
 1999 - Linbury Prize for Stage Design

References

German scenic designers
Living people
Alumni of Central Saint Martins
Year of birth missing (living people)